Len Clark (born 30 January 1947) is a former Australian rules footballer who played with Collingwood in the Victorian Football League (VFL). He later played with Preston in the Victorian Football Association (VFA) and was the league leading goalkicker in 1972.

Notes

External links 

1947 births
Australian rules footballers from Victoria (Australia)
Collingwood Football Club players
Living people
Preston Football Club (VFA) players